Vântu is a Romanian surname. Notable people with the surname include:

Mihail Vântu (1873–1943), Romanian politician and journalist
Sorin Ovidiu Vântu (born 1955), Romanian convicted criminal and businessman

Romanian-language surnames